Rockport High School is a public high school in Rockport, Massachusetts.

History
Rockport has had four different high school buildings. The Old Rockport High School was built in 1865 and now serves as the Rockport Community Center. The second building, located at 4 Broadway, was built in 1925, and served the school system in a variety of capacities until 1988. That structure was designed by the architecture firm J. Williams Beal, Sons. The high school was moved in the 1960s to the George Tarr School, a converted 1904 textile mill building, adjacent to the 1925 building. Rockport High moved into its present facility at 24 Jerdens Lane in 1988.

Both the 1865 and 1925 buildings are listed on the National Register of Historic Places.

Athletics
Home of the Vikings, Rockport High School athletic teams wear the colors of maroon and silver. The school competes within the Cape Ann League in a select number of sports, including baseball, basketball, field hockey, ice hockey, soccer, and softball.

Notable alumni
Paula Cole, singer
Andrew Stanton, producer
Anna Zerilli, football player

See also
National Register of Historic Places listings in Essex County, Massachusetts

References

External links

Cape Ann League
School buildings on the National Register of Historic Places in Massachusetts
Rockport, Massachusetts
National Register of Historic Places in Essex County, Massachusetts
Public high schools in Massachusetts